Spring Rain may refer to:

spring rain

Art
Spring Rain, 1911, silk screen painting by Kawai Gyokudō
Spring Rain, 1912, painting by John Sloan in Delaware Art Museum
Spring Rain, 1963, painting by Vasily Golubev
Spring Rain, 1992, sculpture by Mark di Suvero in Technoseum, Mannheim

Books 
Spring Rain, 1942 Bernard Malamud bibliography
Spring Rain, 1992 first science fiction story of John Meaney

Japan
Harusame (春雨 Spring-rain) Japanese cellophane noodles
Harusame (disambiguation) (春雨 Spring-rain)
Haru no ame (春の雨 Spring Rain) Japanese film by Hiroshi Shimizu (director)

Music

Albums
Spring Rain (album) by Canadian composer Hennie Bekker

Songs
"Spring Rain" (Pat Boone song), 1960
Spring Rain (Bebu Silvetti song) "Lluvia De Primavera" instrumental 1975, theme of The Love Experts
Spring Rain (Max song)
"Spring Rain (Go-Betweens song)", song by	The Go-Betweens 1986 from Liberty Belle and the Black Diamond Express and Bellavista Terrace: Best of The Go-Betweens 
"Spring Rain", song by	Ottmar Liebert from La Semana 2004 
"Spring Rain", Korean song by Ji-hye in Brilliant Legacy (찬란한 유산) TV series soundtrack
"Bom Bi" (봄비, Spring Rain), Korean tune by Baek Ji-young in Gu Family Book (구가의 서) TV series soundtrack